Henrik Holm (born 12 September 1995) is a Norwegian actor and model. He is best known for his portrayal of Even Bech Næsheim in the third and fourth seasons of the teen drama series, Skam. Holm also played a role in the television series Halvbroren (The Half-Brother) in 2013.

Holm won the Gullruten Audience Award for his character, Even, along with co-star Tarjei Sandvik Moe's character Isak Valtersen. The Gullruten ceremony also awarded Best TV Moment of the Year to the Skam season 3 scene "O Helga Natt", in which Moe and Holm starred.

Personal life 
Holm dated Instagram personality Lea Meyer from 2016 to 2020.

Filmography

Film

Television

Theater

Awards

References

External links 
 

1995 births
21st-century Norwegian male actors
Living people
Norwegian male film actors
Norwegian male models
Norwegian male stage actors
Norwegian male television actors
Place of birth missing (living people)